Freshwater mangrove is a common name for several trees of the genus Barringtonia and may refer to:

Barringtonia acutangula
Barringtonia racemosa